This is a list of dignitaries at the state funeral of Pope John Paul II. After the death of Pope John Paul II on 2 April 2005, in Vatican City, and before official invitations were sent by the College of Cardinals, almost 200 countries expressed interest in sending representatives to his funeral. The funeral took place on 8 April 2005, and was one of the largest gathering of statesmen and world leaders in history. Some of the dignitaries later attended the installation of Pope Benedict XVI on 24 April 2005.

In order to accommodate all interested parties wishing to receive a seat during the Mass of Requiem, the Holy See limited the number of members in each official diplomatic delegation to five people, except for the Polish delegation which, being John Paul II's homeland, was allowed ten people, and the delegation from Italy. The limit did not exclude other people of any nationality from attaining individual invitations, unrelated to the individual's country's delegation: for example, the attendance of Fernando Henrique Cardoso, former president of Brazil, had no connection with the Brazilian delegation. In addition to a country's official delegation, any number of government officials were permitted to attend as pilgrim travellers, remaining outside the basilica during the Mass of Requiem with the general public. For example, the United States delegation included the president and first lady, two former presidents, and the secretary of state, and they all had seats in the basilica during the Mass of Requiem. Dozens of members of the Congress of the United States attended the Mass of Requiem, congregating among the general public outside the basilica.

At the funeral, the dignitaries were seated alphabetically according to the French spelling of their country's name and arranged according to diplomatic protocol.

10 sovereigns, 80 past and present elected heads of state, 75 heads of governments and numerous dignitaries from 18 multilateral organizations, 15 religions and 112 countries attended this Mass.

List of official delegations (in alphabetical order, incomplete)

A

B

C

D

E

F

G

H

I

J

K

L

M

N

P

Q

R

S

T

U

V

Z

Notes
 "China" used here refers to the Republic of China (ROC) and commonly known as Taiwan, rather than the People's Republic of China (PRC), which does not have diplomatic relations with the Holy See and did not receive any invitations to the funeral. Although the ROC Government lost control of Mainland China at the end of the Chinese Civil War, the Holy See still recognizes the ROC, but not the PRC, as the legitimate representative for the government of "China". 
 The low representation of Monaco is due to the death of Rainier III, Prince of Monaco. Monaco's head of state died two days before the funeral of the Pope.

International organizations

Religious leaders

Eastern Christian Churches
Bartholomew I, Ecumenical Patriarch of Constantinople, primus inter pares of the Eastern Orthodox Church
Karekin II, Catholicos of the Armenian Apostolic Church
Abune Paulos, Patriarch of the Ethiopian Orthodox Tewahedo Church
Mesrob II Mutafyan, Armenian Patriarch of Istanbul and Turkey
Christodoulos, Archbishop of Athens
Anastasios, Archbishop of Tirana, Durrës, and all Albania
Jovan, Metropolitan of Zagreb-Ljubljana and All-Italy of the Serbian Orthodox Church
Kirill, Metropolitan of Smolensk-Kaliningrad, head of the Department of Interchurch relations of the Russian Orthodox Church
Lavrentije, Bishop of Šabac and Valjevo of the Serbian Orthodox Church
Leo, Archbishop of Karelia and All Finland
Seraphim, Bishop of Ottawa, of the Orthodox Church in America

Anglican Communion

Rowan Williams, Lord Archbishop of Canterbury and Primate of All England, spiritual leader of the Church of England and primus inter pares of the Anglican Communion

Protestant Churches
Dr Alison Elliot, Moderator of the General Assembly of the Church of Scotland
K. G. Hammar, Archbishop of Uppsala, Head of the Church of Sweden
Jukka Paarma, Archbishop of Turku, Head of the Church of Finland
Finn Wagle, Bishop of Nidaros and Primus of the Norwegian Lutheran State Church (part of Norwegian official delegation)

Jewish religious leaders
Oded Viener, representing the Chief Rabbis of Israel
Shear-Yishuv Cohen, Chief Rabbi of Haifa
Riccardo Di Segni, Chief Rabbi of Rome

Druze religious leaders
Mowafaq Tarif, The spiritual leader of the Druze community in Israel

Unofficial delegations
A selection of dignitaries not seated in the section for official national delegations during the funeral:

Brazil
Individually invited (by the Holy See):
Fernando Henrique Cardoso, former President of Brazil
Itamar Franco, Brazilian Ambassador to Italy; former President of Brazil
Bishop Odilo Scherer, secretary-general of the CNBB (Assembly of the Brazilian Bishops)

Presidential delegation (invited by the President, but did not seat for Mass of Requiem):
José Sarney, Brazilian senator; former President of Brazil and former president of the Brazilian Senate
Henry Sobel, leading Rabbi of the Brazilian Jewish community
Sheik Armando Hussein Saleh, of the "Brazilian Mosque" (representing the Muslims of Brazil)
Rolf Schunemann, of the Brazilian Lutheran Church (representing the Protestants of Brazil)
Father João Áviz, Archbishop of Brasília
Father José Ernanne, representing the Brazilian clergy

Canada
All representing Quebec
Gérald Tremblay, Mayor of Montreal
Louise Harel, Representative of the Parti Québécois
Mario Dumont, Member of the National Assembly of Quebec

Germany
 Angela Merkel, Party leader of the CDU
 Edmund Stoiber, Minister-President of Bavaria

Philippines
Leonida Vera, ambassador to the Holy See
Hermilando Mandanas, Batangas congressman

United States
Members of Congress and other dignitaries (not part of the official delegation, thus no VIP treatment):

John Kerry, Senator from Massachusetts
Bill Frist, Senate Majority Leader, Republican, from Tennessee
Ted Kennedy, Senator from Massachusetts, last living brother of John F. Kennedy (the first Catholic to serve as President).
White House Chief of Staff Andrew Card
New York Governor George Pataki
New York City Mayor Michael Bloomberg

Notes and references

External links 
Official (Religious and Political) Delegations in attendance

John Paul II
History of the papacy
Funeral

es:Funeral del Papa Juan Pablo II